The Western Line in Auckland, New Zealand is the name given to suburban rail services that operate between Britomart and Swanson via Newmarket.

Routing 
From Britomart to Newmarket, Western Line services travel on the Newmarket Line, then follow the North Auckland Line to Swanson, the current northernmost station on the network.

History 
In 1877, New Zealand Railways called for tenders for the construction of a railway between Newmarket and Waikomiti (the former name of Glen Eden). Larkins and O'Brien were contracted to construct the rail line and a tunnel cutting through Scroggy Hill (located at modern-day Pleasant Road, West Coast Road and Rua Road). Locals in the area opposed the construction of a tunnel, leading to the railway being constructed over-top of the hill.

The Western Line to Glen Eden was completed in February 1880, and the Western Line stations between Newmarket and Glen Eden were opened on 27 March 1880: Mount Eden, Kingsland, Mount Albert, Avondale, New Lynn and Glen Eden. The line was extended to Henderson over the course of the year, and the Henderson railway station was opened on 21 December 1880.

In 1881, the line was extended to Helensville. This caused the closure of the Riverhead railway station and the Kumeu–Riverhead Section, a railway that was built in 1875 that connected Huapai/Kumeū to the port at Riverhead.

Scroggy Hill between Glen Eden and New Lynn posed a major issue for trains, as the gradient was too steep for many to traverse. Occasionally trains were forced to stop near the top of the hill and leave half their carriages behind; continuing on to Glen Eden and returning later for the second set of carriages. A ravine was cut through the hill during World War II.

By the early 20th century, an intensive suburban service ran between Auckland city centre and Henderson, with some mixed trains progressing to Helensville via Waitakere. When the mixed trains were withdrawn, Helensville became New Zealand's northernmost passenger terminus with a daily service to Auckland. However, in February 1980, the Minister of Railways, Colin McLachlan, announced it would be cancelled due to a lack of rolling stock. On 18 August 1980, a new timetable was implemented – it eliminated the Helensville service, with Waitakere becoming the new terminus. At the same time, the stations at Westbrook, Croydon Road, and St George's Street were closed to suburban traffic on a trial basis that was later made permanent.

ADK and ADL classes of diesel multiple units (DMUs) were purchased in 1993 to replace locomotive-hauled carriage trains. In 1997, as the DMUs stimulated increased patronage, work was undertaken by Auckland Regional Council to extend platforms so that longer trains could be accommodated. To enable more frequent services, construction began on 9 April 2004 to double track the line between Mount Eden and Morningside. When this new track entered service, a new timetable was introduced on 14 February 2005 with more frequent trains between Britomart and Waitakere, particularly during peak periods. This timetable also introduced short run services between Britomart and New Lynn. This was followed by the opening of a new double platform Kingsland station on 21 May 2005, replacing the old single platform station. Further patronage growth meant that on 25 October 2005, another new timetable was implemented and it featured the re-introduction of features that had been absent for many years, including express services from Waitakere to Britomart on weekdays and Sunday trains between Britomart and New Lynn. The weekday service frequency to Swanson was cut to 37 minutes, but this meant trains to Waitakere ran only every 74 minutes.

Helensville trial 
Beyond Waitakere, services between Auckland and Helensville resumed in July 2008 on a trial basis, with a minimum of forty passengers daily required for the train to be permanently reinstated, but the service was terminated again in December 2009, because an average of only 43 passengers per day used the three daily services, requiring a much above-average subsidy.

Double-tracking 
The first section of the duplication had been undertaken by Auckland Regional Council, as 'Project Boston', adding 2.2 km of double track between Boston Road Station and Morningside Station by early 2005.

In May 2005, work began to prepare the rail corridor between New Lynn and Henderson for double tracking and construction of the double track commenced on 31 December 2005. On 19 December 2006, the central government approved a NZ$120 million package for double trackage in the other direction from New Lynn to Avondale; this included a 1 km long, 8 m deep trench through the centre of New Lynn for which construction began in 2009.

On 8 June 2010, the double tracking of the Western Line was completed, enabling trains to run in both directions on one of two tracks all the way between Britomart Transport Centre in the Auckland CBD and Swanson station in Waitakere. The double-tracking cost $420 million and employed around 400 people. The last section was a 3 km stretch between Avondale Station and Titirangi Road in New Lynn. The station opened in September 2010.

From the completion of the electrification of Auckland's suburban network in July 2015, services ceased on the non-electrified section of track between Waitakere and Swanson stations and were replaced by buses. This made Swanson the current northwestern terminus on the Western Line, as considering the low passenger numbers at Waitakere Station, increasing the height in the Waitakere Tunnel was not considered justified. Waitakere Village is now served by bus services connecting to Swanson and Henderson.

Additional Station 
On 12 March 2017, Parnell Station was opened to Western Line services. Westfield station on the Eastern and Southern Lines closed on the same day.

Services 
Suburban services are operated by Auckland One Rail under the Auckland Transport brand.

See also 
 Public transport in Auckland
 List of Auckland railway stations

References 

Railway lines in New Zealand
Public transport in Auckland
Rail transport in Auckland